Reserva do Iguaçu is a Brazilian municipality in the state of Paraná. Main industries include agriculture, cattle and woodworks. There is also a government hydroelectric plant called Ney Braga (Hydroelectric Plant of Secret) in the city.

The city also boasts three important tourist attractions – the Regional Museum of the Iguaçu, the House of Rock (large house of the Fiat), and the Sanctuary of Passo of the Reserve.

References

Municipalities in Paraná